Anthony Hepburn (born 22 May 1932) was a Scottish footballer who played for Celtic, Dumbarton, Ayr United and Morton.

References

1932 births
Scottish footballers
Dumbarton F.C. players
Celtic F.C. players
Ayr United F.C. players
Greenock Morton F.C. players
Scottish Football League players
Association football forwards
Living people